Gigel Anghel (born 25 February 1955) is a Romanian wrestler. He competed in the men's freestyle 57 kg at the 1976 Summer Olympics.

References

External links

1955 births
Living people
Romanian male sport wrestlers
Olympic wrestlers of Romania
Wrestlers at the 1976 Summer Olympics
Place of birth missing (living people)